General Sir John Irwin KB (1727/28 – May 1788) was an Irish soldier who served in the British Army.

Career
Educated in Ireland, Irwin was commissioned into the 5th Regiment of Foot in 1736. He served in an attack on the French coast in 1758 and then fought under Prince Ferdinand of Brunswick in Germany in 1760.

He served as Member of Parliament (MP) for East Grinstead from 1762 to 1783, Governor of Gibraltar from 1765 to 1767, member of the Irish privy council, and as Commander-in-Chief, Ireland from 1775 to 1782. Losing the last of these posts on the fall of Lord North's administration in March 1782, he moved back into his house in Piccadilly and his place in parliament, rising to full General and retiring from parliament in 1783. In debt, in 1783 he moved to France and then Parma, where he was welcomed by Ferdinand, Duke of Parma and Maria Amalia, Duchess of Parma, and hosted British ex-patriates and visitors to the city until his death.

Family
He married three times: to Elizabeth Henry in 1749, to Anne Barry in 1753 and finally to Caroline with whom he had two children.

References

External links

|-

1727 births
1788 deaths
Military personnel from Dublin (city)
57th Regiment of Foot officers
Carabiniers (6th Dragoon Guards) officers
Commanders-in-Chief, Ireland
Governors of Gibraltar
Members of the Parliament of Great Britain for English constituencies
British MPs 1761–1768
British MPs 1768–1774
British MPs 1774–1780
British MPs 1780–1784
Members of the Privy Council of Ireland
British Army generals
British Army personnel of the Seven Years' War
Irish colonial officials
Irish soldiers